Events from the year 1855 in France.

Incumbents
 Monarch – Napoleon III

Events
1 March – Compagnie Générale des Omnibus established to secure a monopoly over horse-buses in Paris.
15 May–15 November – Exposition Universelle in Paris. This gives rise to the Bordeaux Wine Official Classification of 1855.
16 August – Battle of Chernaya River, Russian troops defeated by French and Sardinian forces in the Crimean War.
7 September – Battle of Malakoff, French victory over Russian forces, part of the siege of Sevastopol.
11 September – siege of Sevastopol ends in Franco-British victory.
17 October – Battle of Kinburn, combined British Royal Navy and French Navy force engage Russian forts on shore.

Undated
ROAM (Réunion des Organismes d'Assurance Mutuelle) association is founded.

Births
20 January – Ernest Chausson, composer (died 1899)
15 February – Jean-Joseph Carriès, sculptor, ceramist, and miniaturist (died 1894)
18 February – Jean Jules Jusserand, author and diplomat (died 1932)
16 March – Achille Maffre de Baugé, poet (died 1928)
27 April – Caroline Rémy de Guebhard, socialist, journalist and feminist (died 1929)
27 September – Paul Émile Appell, mathematician (died 1930)
5 November – Léon Teisserenc de Bort, meteorologist (died 1913)
10 November – Alexandre Darracq, automobile manufacturer (died 1931)

Deaths
15 January – Henri Braconnot, chemist and pharmacist (born 1780)
26 January – Gérard de Nerval, poet, essayist and translator (born 1808)
3 March 
Jacques-Charles Dupont de l'Eure, lawyer and Prime Minister (born 1767)
Antoine-Geneviève-Héraclius-Agénor de Gramont, aristocrat (born 1789)
26 May – Jean Isidore Harispe, Marshal of France (born 1768)
18 April – Jean-Baptiste Isabey, painter (born 1767)
10 June – Jacques-Jean Barre, engraver (born 1793)
23 October – François André Michaux, botanist (born 1770)
25 November – Pierre-Justin-Marie Macquart, entomologist (born 1778)
2 December – Frédéric Berat, poet and songwriter (born 1801)
Full date unknown – Raymond Gayrard, sculptor (born 1807)

The arts
Jean-François Millet produces the engraving "Study of a Woman Churning Butter".

References

1850s in France